Jan Elias Nicolaas, Baron Schimmelpenninck van der Oye (12 August 1836 – 11 April 1914) was a Dutch politician.

Schimmelpenninck van der Oye was a general of military engineering who, as a member of the Anti-Revolutionary Party, became both a member of the member of the House of Representatives and of the Senate. He served as President of the Senate between 1902 and 1914. He was preceded by Albertus van Naamen van Eemnes and was in turn succeeded by Jan Joseph Godfried van Voorst tot Voorst.

Honours
 – Officer of the Order of the Oak Crown (1880)
 – Knight of the Order of the Netherlands Lion (1887)
 – Knight Grand Cross of the Order of the Netherlands Lion (1909)

References

1836 births
1914 deaths
People from Brummen
Anti-Revolutionary Party politicians
Free Anti Revolutionary Party politicians
Christian Historical Party politicians
Christian Historical Union politicians
20th-century Dutch politicians
Presidents of the Senate (Netherlands)
Members of the Senate (Netherlands)
Barons of Schimmelpenninck van der Oye